During the 1978–79 season A.C. Perugia competed in Serie A and Coppa Italia.

Summary 
A.C. Perugia was the first team during the round-robin era to go through the season undefeated, although due to their number of drawn matches, they finished second in the league.

The campaign is best recalled as Perugia and the undefeated season of miracles, The Grifoni, displaying the prowess of the legendary beast their nickname is derived from, produced a feat never before achieved at the highest level of Italian football: going a season undefeated. With the head of a lion and the body of an eagle, there's a majesty about a Gryphon, and in this particular season, Perugia lived up to its reputation. That they failed to secure the Scudetto shouldn't detract from their momentous achievement; it should define it.

‘Never loses, but does not win’ is an ill-thought barb often stabbed at this particular Perugia team's fate, and like so many such disparaging comments, although there is an element of truth in it, there also a substantial amount of bitterness from the tifosi of the more established powers in the game that their team didn't achieve such a record.

With just six games of the season remaining, the unlikely title challengers sat just two points behind leaders Milan and still had to host the Rossoneri after gaining a 1–1 draw away earlier in the campaign.

A win could have ensured that Perugia put themselves in pole position in the run-in but despite being cheered on by an immensely intimidating atmosphere, Gianfranco Casarsa's spot kick which cancelled out Stefano Chiodi's penalty for Milan minutes earlier, meant that the title was Milan's to lose.

Despite disappointing draws away to Catanzaro and Hellas Verona in the weeks that followed, Perugia were still in with a chance of final day success providing that Milan lost and Perugia picked up the win away to Bologna.

Although Salvatore Bagni's brace put the visitors ahead and had their fans dreaming once more, Bologna rallied and fought to a 2–2 draw which brought an end to the fairytale but still meant that despite all the odds, Perugia had not only mustered a title challenge but ended the season without once tasting defeat.

Squad 

(Captain)

Transfers

Competitions

Serie A

League table

Result by round

Matches

Coppa Italia

Group phase

Quarterfinals

Statistics

Players statistics

See also
List of unbeaten football club seasons

References

External links
 

A.C. Perugia Calcio seasons
Perugia